Pehi James "PJ" Solomon is a former international rugby player from Porirua, New Zealand. With eligibility via his mother from Kirkcaldy, he represented Scotland at rugby league. Solomon played as a centre.

Union
Solomon played club rugby union in Scotland for Gala RFC and Edinburgh Academicals.

League
He played rugby league in England for Lancashire Lynx and Doncaster and played internationally for Scotland in the Rugby League European Cup. He was part of the side that played against France in the 2003 game in Narbonne, needing to win by five points to qualify for the final. Solomon and his teammates won 8–6 and so were eliminated from the competition at that stage.

Off the pitch
Solomon is married with one son and one daughter. His wife is the sister of Estonian professional basketballer, Heiko Niidas. Solomon works in the construction industry.

References

1976 births
Living people
Chorley Lynx players
Doncaster R.L.F.C. players
Edinburgh Academicals rugby union players
Gala RFC players
New Zealand expatriate sportspeople in Scotland
New Zealand people of Scottish descent
New Zealand rugby league players
New Zealand rugby union players
Rugby league centres
Rugby league players from Porirua
Rugby union players from Porirua
Rugby union centres
Scotland national rugby league team players